Chaetolimon is a genus of flowering plants belonging to the family Plumbaginaceae.

Its native range is Central Asia to Afghanistan.

Species:

Chaetolimon limbatum 
Chaetolimon setiferum 
Chaetolimon sogdianum

References

Plumbaginaceae
Caryophyllales genera
Taxa named by Alexander von Bunge